Donatucci is an Italian surname. Notable people with the surname include:

 Maria Donatucci (born 1954), American politician
 Robert Donatucci (1952–2010), American politician, husband of Maria
 Ronald Donatucci (born 1948), American politician

Italian-language surnames